Japanese hardcore is the hardcore punk scene in Japan, which originated to protest the social and economic changes sweeping the country in the 1980s. The band SS is regarded as the first, forming in 1977. Bands such as The Stalin and GISM soon followed, forming in 1980 and 1981 respectively. Occasionally, Japanese hardcore musicians include elements of crossover thrash, thrash metal, anarcho-punk, horror punk, D-beat, post-hardcore and grindcore in their songs.

List of notable bands
Anti Feminism
The Comes
Disclose
Envy
GISM
Garlic Boys
Gauze
Maximum the Hormone
S.O.B.
SS
The Stalin

References

Sources
Hoare, James. "Japanese Grindcore". Terrorizer issue 180, February 2009, p. 52-53.

External links
MCR Co., a Japanese hardcore punk label

Music scenes
Hardcore
Hardcore punk
Punk by country